Mae Taeng may refer to:
 Mae Taeng District
 Mae Taeng Subdistrict